Akaganeite, also written as the deprecated Akaganéite, is a chloride-containing iron(III) oxide-hydroxide mineral, formed by the weathering of pyrrhotite (Fe1−xS). 

Nickel may substitute for iron, yielding the more general formula 

Akaganeite has a metallic luster and a brownish yellow streak. Its crystal structure is monoclinic and similar to that of hollandite , characterised by the presence of tunnels parallel to the c-axis of the tetragonal lattice. These tunnels are partially occupied by chloride anions that give to the crystal its structural stability.

Occurrence
The mineral was discovered in the Akagane mine in Iwate, Japan, for which it is named. It was described by the Japanese mineralogist Matsuo Nambu in 1968, but named as early as 1961.

Akaganeite has also been found in widely dispersed locations around the world and in rocks from the Moon that were brought back during the Apollo Project. The occurrences in meteorites and the lunar sample are thought to have been produced by interaction with Earth's atmosphere.  It has been detected on Mars through orbital imaging spectroscopy.

See also
List of minerals

References

External links
Mindat with locations
Webmineral
Weisstein

Iron(III) minerals
Halide minerals
Oxide minerals
Monoclinic minerals
Minerals in space group 12
Minerals described in 1968